Tubular Bells II, The Performance Live at Edinburgh Castle is a live concert video by Mike Oldfield released in 1992.

Background 
The video is a full faithful performance from the premiere concert of the Tubular Bells II album at Edinburgh Castle. The tour continued until the following October. John Gordon Sinclair performed the part of the Master of Ceremonies at the concert; on the album Alan Rickman was the Master of Ceremonies. The concert finishes with a reprise of "The Bell". Eight thousand people were at the concert in Edinburgh, Scotland.

It was released on VHS and Laserdisc in 1992, and later packaged with Tubular Bells III Live on DVD.

Track listing 
 "Sentinel"
 "Dark Star"
 "Clear Light"
 "Blue Saloon"
 "Sunjammer"
 "Red Dawn"
 "The Bell"
 "Weightless"
 "The Great Plain"
 "Sunset Door"
 "Tattoo"
 "Altered State"
 "Maya Gold"
 "Moonshine"
 "Reprise"

Personnel 
 Mike Oldfield - Acoustic guitar, Classical guitar, Electric guitar, Banjo, Keyboards, Vocals, Tubular bells
 Robin A Smith – Conductor
 David Bedford – Orchestration
 Jay Stapley – Guitar
 Hugh Burns – Guitar
 Alan Limbrick – Guitar
 Craig Pruess – Keyboards
 Richard Cottle – Keyboards
 Dave Hartley – Keyboards
 Adrian Thomas – Programmer
 Yitkin Seow – Piano
 Lawrence Cottle – Bass guitar
 Ian Thomas – Drums
 Ben Hoffnung – Percussion
 Alasdair Malloy – Percussion
 Gerry McKenna – Banjo
 Pete Clarke – Fiddle
 John Parricelli – Mandolin & Guitar
 Jackie Quinn – Vocals
 Linda Taylor – Vocals
 Edie Lehmann – Vocals
 Susannah Melvoin – Vocals
 John Gordon Sinclair – MC

References

External links 
 

Concert films
Mike Oldfield video albums
1992 live albums
Live video albums
1992 video albums